There are several rivers named Mosquito River.

Brazil
 Mosquito River (Minas Gerais)
 Mosquito River (Tocantins)

United States
 Mosquito River (Michigan)

See also 
 Mosquito (disambiguation)